

Peerage of England

|Earl of Surrey (1088)||William de Warenne, 5th Earl of Surrey||1199||1240|| 
|-
|Earl of Warwick (1088)||Thomas de Beaumont, 6th Earl of Warwick||1229||1242||
|-
|Earl of Leicester (1107)||Simon de Montfort, 6th Earl of Leicester||1218||1265|| 
|-
|rowspan="3"|Earl of Chester (1121)||Ranulf de Blondeville, 6th Earl of Chester||1181||1232||1st Earl of Lincoln (1217)
|-
|Matilda of Chester||1232||1232||Died
|-
|John of Scotland, 7th Earl of Chester||1232||1237||Died, title became extinct
|-
|rowspan="2"|Earl of Gloucester (1122)||Gilbert de Clare, 5th Earl of Gloucester||1217||1230||4th Earl of Hertford; Died
|-
|Richard de Clare, 6th Earl of Gloucester||1230||1262||5th Earl of Hertford
|-
|Earl of Arundel (1138)||Hugh d'Aubigny, 5th Earl of Arundel||1224||1243||
|-
|Earl of Derby (1138)||William de Ferrers, 4th Earl of Derby||1190||1247|| 
|-
|Earl of Norfolk (1140)||Roger Bigod, 4th Earl of Norfolk||1225||1270||
|-
|Earl of Devon (1141)||Baldwin de Redvers, 6th Earl of Devon||1217||1245|| 
|-
|Earl of Oxford (1142)||Hugh de Vere, 4th Earl of Oxford||1221||1263||
|-
|Earl of Salisbury (1145)||Ela of Salisbury, 3rd Countess of Salisbury||1196||1261||
|-
|rowspan="3"|Earl of Pembroke (1189)||William Marshal, 2nd Earl of Pembroke||1219||1231||Died
|-
|Richard Marshal, 3rd Earl of Pembroke||1231||1234||Died
|-
|Gilbert Marshal, 4th Earl of Pembroke||1234||1241||
|-
|Earl of Hereford (1199)||Humphrey de Bohun, 2nd Earl of Hereford||1220||1275||1st Earl of Essex (1239)
|-
|Earl of Winchester (1207)||Roger de Quincy, 2nd Earl of Winchester||1219||1264||
|-
|rowspan="2"|Earl of Lincoln (1217)||Hawise of Chester, 1st Countess of Lincoln||1231||1232||Title gifted inter vivos to her daughter
|-
|John de Lacy, 2nd Earl of Lincoln and Margaret de Quincy, Countess of Lincoln||1232 1232||1240 1266||held jointly
|-
|Earl of Richmond (1219)||Peter de Braine, 1st Earl of Richmond||1219||1235||Title forfeited
|-
|Earl of Cornwall (1225)||Richard, 1st Earl of Cornwall||1225||1272||
|-
|Earl of Kent (1227)||Hubert de Burgh, 1st Earl of Kent||1227||1243||

Peerage of Scotland

|Earl of Mar (1114)||Donnchadh, Earl of Mar||Abt. 1220||Abt. 1240||
|-
|rowspan=2|Earl of Dunbar (1115)||Patrick I, Earl of Dunbar||1182||1232||Died
|-
|Patrick II, Earl of Dunbar||1232||1248||
|-
|Earl of Angus (1115)||Máel Coluim, Earl of Angus||1214||1240||
|-
|rowspan=2|Earl of Atholl (1115)||Isabella, Countess of Atholl||1210||Abt. 1231||Died
|-
|Padraig, Earl of Atholl||Abt. 1231||1241||
|-
|Earl of Buchan (1115)||Margaret, Countess of Buchan||Abt. 1195||Abt. 1243||
|-
|Earl of Strathearn (1115)||Robert, Earl of Strathearn||1223||1245||
|-
|Earl of Fife (1129)||Máel Coluim II, Earl of Fife||1228||1266||
|-
|rowspan=2|Earl of Menteith (1160)||Muireadhach II, Earl of Menteith||Abt. 1213||Abt. 1230||Died
|-
|Isabella, Countess of Menteith||Abt. 1230||1258||
|-
|Earl of Lennox (1184)||Maol Domhnaich, Earl of Lennox||1220||1260||
|-
|Earl of Carrick (1184)||Donnchadh, Earl of Carrick||1186||1250||
|-
|Earl of Ross (1215)||Fearchar, Earl of Ross||1215||1251||
|-
|Earl of Sutherland (1235)||William de Moravia, 1st Earl of Sutherland||1235||1248||New creation
|-
|}

Peerage of Ireland

|Earl of Ulster (1205)||Hugh de Lacy, 1st Earl of Ulster||1205||1242||
|-
|Baron Athenry (1172)||Peter de Bermingham||1218||1244||
|-
|rowspan=2|Baron Kingsale (1223)||Miles de Courcy, 1st Baron Kingsale||1223||1230||Died
|-
|Patrick de Courcy, 2nd Baron Kingsale||1230||1260||
|-
|Baron Kerry (1223)||Thomas Fitzmaurice, 1st Baron Kerry||1223||1260||
|-
|}

References

 

Lists of peers by decade
1230s in England
1230s in Ireland
13th century in Scotland
13th-century English people
13th-century Irish people
13th-century mormaers
Peers